Turnersburg is an unincorporated community in Iredell County, North Carolina, United States. Turnersburg has a post office with ZIP code 28688.

The town of Turnersburg was created in 1858.  The unincorporated community of Turnersburg has been within the boundaries of Olin Township since townships were created in 1868 to conform with the North Carolina constitution.   There is also a Turnersburg Township, which is east of Olin township.

References

Unincorporated communities in Iredell County, North Carolina
Unincorporated communities in North Carolina